The 'MIT Center for Digital Business' is an industry-funded research center headquartered at the MIT Sloan School of Management.

MIT Initiative on the Digital Economy
In 2013, the Center for Digital Business organized and launched the Institute-wide MIT Initiative on the Digital Economy, to address the impact of digital technologies on the world, led by Erik Brynjolfsson and Andrew McAfee.

See also 
 Digital Transformation (Business)

References

External links 
 Center for Digital Business Official site
  MIT Sloan Management Review web site

Massachusetts Institute of Technology